Amphiops austrinus is a species of water beetle in the family Hydrophilidae, first described by Chris H.S. Watts in 1998.

Both larvae and adults are aquatic. The species is found in freshwater, in coastal zones of Queensland.

References

Hydrophilinae
Taxa described in 1998
Insects of Queensland
Aquatic insects